The 34th Golden Raspberry Awards, or Razzies, was a parodic award ceremony that honored the worst films the film industry had to offer in 2013. Nominations were revealed on January 15, 2014, and the winners were announced on March 1, 2014. The pre-nomination ballot was revealed on December 26, 2013.

Winners and nominees

Films with multiple nominations
The following films received multiple nominations:

References

34
2013 film awards
2014 in American cinema
2014 in California
March 2014 events in the United States
Golden Raspberry